Pedababu is a 2004 Indian Telugu-language action drama film, produced by M.L. Kumar Chowdary on Sri Keerthi Creations banner and directed by Paruchuri Murali. Starring Jagapathi Babu, Kalyani and music composed by Chakri. Sunil received Filmfare Award for Best Comedian – Telugu for this film. This movie is a remake of Pasumpon.

Plot
The film begins in a village where Pedababu is an arbiter who is esteemed as a deity. However, he lives in solitude far off from his mother Parvati. Do not agree to talk with her as she has performed a re-marriage with Gangadharam but be polite towards them. The couple has 2 sons and a daughter Geeta. Once, a venomous Rudraraju belonging to an adjacent village tries to molest a girl when an inflamed Pedababu chops his hand. So, he mingles with his sly brother-in-law Kanakaraju and is vindictive toward Pedababu. They avail of the half-sibling begrudge on his prosperity and make a point of affronting him. Besides, Neelavani cousin of Pedababu strongly adores him and he also quietly dear her. Meanwhile, Geeta loves Bhaskar the grandson of Pedababu’s scribe Raghavaiah whom he gives utmost respect. Kanakaraju divulges it to her brothers and they clout Bhaskar when Pedababu comes to get word to unite the pair. At that point, the step-brothers' question, who is he to do? when Parvati asserts him as her elder son which he refuses and she collapses. 

As a result, everyone accuses Pedababu of his deed. Then, he is overwhelmed with grief and moves rearward. 25 years ago, Sivaramaiah his grandfather a rectitude and forefront hold the same reverence as Pedababu. He knitted Parvati with a wise guy and they are blessed with Pedababu. Soon after, Pedababu’s father passes away which distraught’s Sivaramaiah, and his health deteriorate. Gangadharam is his unimpeachable servant whom he requests to nuptial his daughter and forcibly makes Parvati agree. Next, Sivaramaiah arrays the horoscopes to an omnipotent saint who states that Pedababu ignites the death of his parents. Plus, the concrete outlet for it is to detach the mother and the kid. Overhearing it, Pedababu ascertains his mother's safety as vital and residing apart from her. 

Concurrently, Chandu son of an amoral MP aspires to possess Geeta. Accordingly, they move with offers of espousal through Kanakaraju and rapacious brothers take the plea. Here, Pedababu warns the MP and vows to unite the two birds by wiping off anyone who stands in the way. Hence, he wiles to slaughter Pedababu at the temple, given that he stands still until prayer ends when nature shields him from the evils. Thus, MP & his men hustle back viewing the furious form of Pedababu. Being cognizant of it, Rudraraju violently attempts to wedlock Geeta, backstabbing her brothers and smacking the parents. Spotting it, Pedababu flares up, protects his family, and ceases the black guards. Therein, the brothers reform and seek to pardon Pedababu. Now Parvati pleads with him to endorse her as his mother but he still keeps silent. Due to that crash, Parvati becomes terminally ill. At last, Pedababu bows his head before God reaches and calls Parvati as a mother which makes her recoup. Finally, the movie ends on a happy note with the reunion of the family.

Cast

 Jagapati Babu as Pedababu
 Kalyani as Neelaveni
 K Viswanath as Sivaramaiah
 Suhasini as Parvathi
 Kota Srinivasa Rao as Kanaka Raju
 Sunil as Bapineedu
 Sarath Babu as Gangadharam
 Vijayachander as Saint
 Ponnambalam as Rudra Raju
 Ajay as Pedababu's younger brother
 Bharath as Pedababu's younger brother
 Prabhu
 Rallapalli as Raghavaiah
 Devadas Kanakala as Registrar
 Vizag Prasad as M.P.
 Chittajalu Lakshmipati as Barber Sattibabu
 Fish Venkat as Kanaka Raju's henchman
 Jenny as Teacher
 Harika as Geeta
 Shobha
 Sakhi
 Uma
 Master Deepak Saroj as Young Pedababu

Soundtrack

Music composed by Chakri. Music released on SOHAN Audio Company.

Awards

References

External links
 

Indian comedy-drama films
Films scored by Chakri
2000s Telugu-language films